Vyaghrapada is a sage featured in Hindu literature.

Legend
According to legend, Vyaghrapada was entrusted with the task of picking up fresh flowers, untouched even by honeybees, for offering to Shiva in his aspect as Nataraja in the temple complex of Chidambaram, located in the Indian state of Tamil Nadu. While plucking the flowers, Vyaghrapada was wounded on account of thorns and sharp stones. Shiva conferred on him feet of tigers to relieve him of his pain. Now bearing tiger's feet, the sage easily moved from place to place, including climbing rough trees to pluck fresh flowers untouched even by the honeybees. Both the sages Patanjali and Vyaghrapada venerated Shiva, and in response, the deity performed the ananda tandava, his dance of bliss.

The sage is also associated with the king known as Lokeshavikrama, whom he adopts as his son, as described in a sthala purana. 

Vyaghrapada is also believed to be the founder of the famous Shiva temple at Vaikom in Kottayam district, Kerala.

Iconography
His image and iconography depicts him as a human being but with the legs of a tiger. He is also shown having a tiger-like tail. Generally, he is shown alongside Patanjali, and both are depicted as offering homage to Shiva in his aspect as Nataraja.

The Sthalasayana Perumal Temple, Tirusirupuliyur in Tamil Nadu, a Vishnu temple, is regarded to have been visited by Vyaghrapada with Patanjali, the sages receiving the darshana of Vishnu in the form of Ranganatha of Srirangam.

See also
Patanjali
Bhringi
Markandeya

Sources
Dictionary of Hindu Lore and Legend by Anna Dallapiccola

References 
Rishis

Hindu mythology